Stuntz is a surname. Notable people with the surname include:

Daniel Elliot Stuntz (1909–1983), American businessman
Jean A. Stuntz (born 1957), American historian
Johann Baptist Stuntz (1753–1836), Swiss-German landscape painter
Johnno Stuntz (1884–1917), Australian rugby league footballer
Stephen Conrad Stuntz (1875 – 1918), American botanist and fiction author with the author citation Stuntz.
William J. Stuntz (1958–2011), American legal scholar